Betsy Blair (born Elizabeth Winifred Boger; December 11, 1923March 13, 2009) was an American actress of film and stage, long based in London.

Blair pursued a career in entertainment from the age of eight, and as a child worked as an amateur dancer, performed on radio, and worked as a model, before joining the chorus of Billy Rose's Diamond Horseshoe in 1940. There she met Gene Kelly; they were married the following year, when she was age 17 and divorced sixteen years later in 1957.

After work in the theatre, Blair began her film career playing supporting roles in films such as A Double Life (1947) and Another Part of the Forest (1948). Her interest in Marxism led to an investigation by the House Un-American Activities Committee, and Blair was blacklisted for some time, but resumed her career with a critically acclaimed performance in Marty (1955) for which she was nominated for an Academy Award for Best Supporting Actress.

She continued her career with regular theatre, film and television work, mainly in Europe, until the mid-1990s.

Early life and education
Blair was born in Cliffside Park, New Jersey. Her father, William Kidd Boger, was a partner in a small insurance brokerage firm; her mother, Frederica Ammon, was a schoolteacher. Both were Episcopalians. At the age of eight, she was enrolled in the Swift Sisters School of Dance, and recalled performing before Eleanor Roosevelt in 1933, winning an amateur contest shortly thereafter, joining a touring amateur show and performing on local radio, as motivating influences in her desire to pursue a dance career. She joined the John Robert Powers modeling agency and by the age of 12 was in regular demand. She enrolled in the Professional Children's School but, as it was not accredited, her mother returned her to her local school so that she might eventually attend college. She graduated at 15, securing a scholarship to Sarah Lawrence College. However, the board of admission considered her too immature for entry and requested she wait one year.

Career

Stage

In the interim, Blair joined the chorus at the International Casino in Times Square, and when it closed down, worked in the chorus of Billy Rose's Diamond Horseshoe from January 1940 where Gene Kelly was working as choreographer. "Gene fought for me. He said I could dance, and he needed some good dancers," she wrote in her autobiography. Blair and Kelly's relationship blossomed, culminating in their marriage in October 1941. She and Kelly remained married for 16 years and had one daughter, Kerry Kelly Novick (b. 1942), together before divorcing in 1957.

Blair left Rose's show to accept an offer from choreographer Robert Alton to join the chorus of Panama Hattie, an illustrious line-up which included June Allyson, Doris and Constance Dowling, and Vera-Ellen. Alton—who previously discovered Gene Kelly—had spotted her when she unsuccessfully auditioned for a part in Louisiana Purchase. During this period, she developed a strong interest in Marxism, having been introduced to Lloyd Gough by Kelly, and attended Gough's weekly Marxist study group, which Kelly did not attend. "And it was very serious. Our textbook was The History of the Communist Party of the Soviet Union... I was completely enthralled by the ideas."

In early 1941, Blair secured her first role in a stage play when Kelly's friend William Saroyan chose her to play the female lead role of St. Agnes of the Mice in his play The Beautiful People at the Lyceum Theatre, playing opposite Eugene Loring, and securing excellent reviews from leading critics George Jean Nathan and Richard Watts, Jr. Watts stated, "The gently sweetly sincere and completely moving gravity and innocence of Miss Blair's utterly right performance is so infinitely touching and beautiful than any studied portrayal could be, that her contribution to the work is gracefully enchanting."

Film

Blair was featured in such films as A Double Life (1947), Another Part of the Forest (1948), and The Snake Pit (1948). She continued to hold left-wing political views and admittedly attempted to join the Communist Party. In her autobiography, she revealed her application was rejected as the party felt she would be more valuable as the wife of the progressive Kelly. Kelly himself was not a Communist and his status as a valuable star provided the couple some protection.

In the 1950s, Blair was under investigation from HUAC and blacklisted for several years. She almost lost one of her signature roles, that of Marty's girlfriend in Marty (1955), but was restored to the role after Kelly threatened to pull out of It's Always Fair Weather. For her performance, she received an Academy Award nomination for Best Supporting Actress and prizes from the Cannes Film Festival. Her film career, nonetheless, was damaged during the "red scare" era and she had to seek work on stage in New York and in Europe.

Following her divorce from Kelly, Blair moved permanently to Europe where she paired with French actor and director Roger Pigaut, and continued to appear in films, including Juan Antonio Bardem's Calle Mayor (1956) and Michelangelo Antonioni's Il Grido (1957). By these years, she self-confessedly became a conspicuous member of the avant la lettre European gauche caviar.

Blair married Czech-born British director/producer Karel Reisz in 1963 and performed sporadically in later years, working with Costa-Gavras in 1988 on the film Betrayed and on the mini-series Scarlett in 1994. Reisz died in 2002.

In 1980, she was a member of the jury at the 30th Berlin International Film Festival.

Blair filmed scenes for Stephen Daldry's The Hours (2002), initially playing the older version of Julianne Moore's character. It is unclear if she was dropped or if she withdrew from the project. In 2003, she published her autobiography The Memory of All That.

Death
Blair died of cancer in London on March 13, 2009. She was survived by a daughter, three stepchildren and several grandchildren.

Partial filmography

 The Guilt of Janet Ames (1947) – Katie
 A Double Life (1947) – Girl in Wig Shop
 Another Part of the Forest (1948) – Birdie Bagtry
 The Snake Pit (1948) – Hester
 Mystery Street (1950) – Jackie Elcott
 No Way Out (1950) – Telephone Operator (uncredited)
 Kind Lady (1951) – Ada Elcott
 Marty (1955) – Clara
 Meeting in Paris (1956) – Nancy Blanding
 Calle Mayor (1956) – Isabel
 The Halliday Brand (1957) – Martha Halliday
 Il Grido (1957) – Elvia
 Lies My Father Told Me (1960) – Mother
 Silver Spoon Set (1960) – Countess Margherita Cherè
 All Night Long (1962) – Emily
 Careless (1962) – Amalia Brentani
 Marry Me! Marry Me! (1968) – Second English Teacher
 A Delicate Balance (1973) – Edna
 Flight of the Spruce Goose (1986) – Helen
 Descente aux enfers (1986) – Mrs. Burns
 Betrayed (1988) – Gladys Simmons

Bibliography
, London: Elliott & Thompson.

References

External links

 Obituary
Interview with Blair in 2005
 interview British Entertainment History Project

1923 births
2009 deaths
20th-century American actresses
Actresses from New Jersey
People from Cliffside Park, New Jersey
American expatriates in the United Kingdom
American female dancers
Dancers from New Jersey
American film actresses
American stage actresses
Best Foreign Actress BAFTA Award winners
Deaths from cancer in England
Hollywood blacklist
20th-century American dancers
21st-century American women